En la vía is a 1959 Argentine film. En la vía is a black and white film directed by Argentine director Alberto Du Bois, according to the script Anibal Pastor and Manuel Rojas, who was co - produced between Argentina and Paraguay in 1959, but was never commercially released.
He had starring Olga Zubarry (1930-2012), Juan Carlos Altavista, Francisco Lopez Silva (Spain), and the Paraguayan actors Ernesto Baez, Carlos Gomez and Emigdia Reisofer.

Cast
 Juan Carlos Altavista		
 Ernesto Baez
 Mario Casado		
 Carlos Gómez		
 Daniel Lago		
 Francisco López Silva		
 Puchito		
 Emigdia Reisofer		
 Olga Zubarry

External links

References

1959 films
1950s Spanish-language films
Argentine black-and-white films
1950s Argentine films